New Rome (Néa Rhṓmē; ;) was the original name given by the Roman emperor Constantine the Great in 330 CE to his new imperial capital, which was built as an expansion of the city of Byzantium on the European coast of the Bosporus strait. 

The city was founded as Byzantion by Megarian colonists in 657 BCE. It was renamed by Constantine the Great first as "New Rome" (Nova Roma) during the official dedication of the city as the new Roman capital in 330 CE, which he soon afterwards changed to Constantinople (Constantinopolis). The city was officially renamed as Istanbul in the 20th century, after the establishment of the Turkish Republic in 1923.

Constantine essentially rebuilt the city on a monumental scale from 326 to 330, partly modeling it after Rome.

The term "New Rome" was used to indicate that Byzantium, thereafter Constantinople, was the second/new capital of the Roman Empire. In modern times, "New Rome" remains part of the official title of the Orthodox Ecumenical Patriarch of that city.

During the Tetrarchy system established by Diocletian in the 3rd century, Nicomedia (modern İzmit) near Istanbul was the Eastern (and most senior) capital of the Roman Empire (Diocletian had his seat in Nicomedia as the Augustus of the East). The last Roman co-emperor in Nicomedia, Licinius, was defeated by Constantine at the Battle of Chrysopolis (in the modern Üsküdar district on the Asian side of Istanbul) on 18 September 324. Constantine used Nicomedia as his interim capital city between 324 and 330, while rebuilding and expanding Byzantium as Nova Roma (which he soon renamed again as Constantinopolis). Constantine died at a villa near Nicomedia on 22 May 337.

See also
Second Rome (disambiguation)
Third Rome

References

 
City nicknames
Constantinople
History of Istanbul